Lorna Doone is a novel by Richard Doddridge Blackmore. Adaptations include:
Lorna Doone (1912 film), directed by Wilfred Noy
Lorna Doone (1922 film), directed by Maurice Tourneur
Lorna Doone (1934 film), directed by Basil Dean
Lorna Doone (1951 film), starring Barbara Hale and Richard Greene
Lorna Doone (1963 TV series), a 1963 adaptation of the novel in the form of a TV series
Lorna Doone (1976 TV series), a 1976 TV miniseries by the BBC, starring Emily Richard and John Sommerville
Lorna Doone (1990 film), a 1990 British drama television film for ITV starring Sean Bean
Lorna Doone (2000 film), a television movie directed by Mike Barker
Lorna Doone may also refer to:
Lorna Doone (cookie), a Nabisco product
Lorna Doone was one of the GWR 3031 Class locomotives that were built for and ran on the Great Western Railway between 1891 and 1915
PS Lorna Doone, a paddle steamer operated by the Red Funnel line in England 1891–1947

See also
Lorna Doom, best known as the bass guitarist for the punk rock band the Germs